Fitionești is a commune in the center-north hill area of Vrancea County, Western Moldavia, Romania (2,859 inhabitants). The commune is composed of five villages: Ciolănești, Fitionești, Ghimicești, Holbănești and Mănăstioara. Fitionești is said to have taken its name from the Fetion family, an old family of local boyars. The first historical evidence dates back to the Thracian Bronze Age.

Geography
The river Zăbrăuț crosses the village that lies between two hills, surrounded by wooden areas. Fitionești has a varied relief: Bouroș(u) Hill to the East, Valea Rea Valley to the West, followed by Costin Hill; also, Pisc Hill (Pi Chisc) to the northwest, and Ursoaia. Twenty kilometres north of Fitionești, after Glodișteanu Woods, there is Moșinoaiele monastery (Moșânoaia). These surroundings are proper for (agro)tourism.

The closest town is Panciu, ten kilometres to the South-East, which is virtually the only access way to "civilization", historically also referred to as „la Vale“ ("to the fields"). Another neighboring commune is Movilița, to the North-East. To the west, beyond Valea Rea and Costin hill, there is Muncelu village (Străoane commune).

Economy
The inhabitants are mostly farmers. They mainly cultivate maize, beans, and potatoes, also onion, cabbage, radishes, tomatoes, and cucumbers. There are also many vineyards (part of the Panciu vineyard) and orchards in Fitionești. Plums, apples, pears, and sour-cherries are most popular. Also they raise poultry (chicken, geese, ducks, sometimes turkeys), sheep, and cows. They keep horses (they still use them for farming work like ploughing), dogs, and cats.

They produce wine and „rachiu“ (a strong alcoholic drink), cheese, and make some of their clothes at home by hand. Also, some popular home manufacture includes soap, carpets, and brooms, usually for family use, not for selling.

Social facts
Literacy: some old people are illiterate
Ethnicity: In 2002, all inhabitants except two (a German and a Hungarian) were ethnic Romanian.
Religion: 2803 Romanian Orthodox, 5 Roman Catholics and 51 Protestants
Institutions: Căminul Cultural, one communal library, four elementary schools (pupils go on to attend Ioan Slavici high-school in Panciu)
Places of interest: the Mosinoaiele (or Musinoaiele) monastery dedicated to the Ascension of the Holy Virgin, located 20 km from the village. The Musunoaiele hunting fund (boars, brown bears, deer, does, and foxes).

References

Communes in Vrancea County
Localities in Western Moldavia